Chüy is a district of Chüy Region in northern Kyrgyzstan. The district surrounds the city of Tokmok, but does not include it. The administrative seat lies at Tokmok.

Geography

Chüy District is located in the eastern part of Chüy Valley. Its southern part spreads into Kyrgyz Ala-Too mountains. The river Chu (Chüy) and its tributaries Shamshy, Kegeti, etc. dominate the hydrology. There are a number of glaciers feeding tributaries in Kyrgyz Ala-Too such as Shamshy Glacier, Kel-Ter, etc. The climate is continental.

Demographics
As of 2009, Chüy District included 38 villages. Its population, according to the Population and Housing Census of 2009, was 47,017.

Ethnic composition
According to the 2009 Census, the ethnic composition (de jure population) of the Chüy District was:

Rural communities and villages
In total, Chüy District include 38 settlements in 10 rural communities. Each rural community can consist of one or several villages. The rural communities and settlements in the Chüy District are:

Ak-Beshim (seat: Ak-Beshim; incl. Jangy-Jol and Kalygul)
Burana (seat: Döng-Aryk; incl. Alga, Burana and Meenetkech)
 Chüy (seat: Chüy; incl. Aral and Sadovy)
Ibraimov (seat: Koshoy; incl. Kara-Oy, Kyzyl-Asker, Lenin, Lenin-Jol and Taldy-Bulak)
Iskra (seat: Kara-Döbö; incl. Vostochny, Jangy-Turmush, Zheleznodorozhnoye and Iskra)
Kegeti (seat: Kegeti; incl. Arpa-Tektir, Akmatbek, Sovet and Chapaev)
 Kosh-Korgon (seat: Kosh-Korgon)
 On Bir-Jylga (seat: Progress; incl. Kayyrma, Madaniyat and Onbir-Jylga)
 Saylyk (seat: Saylyk; incl. Vinogradnoye and Jangy-Chek)
 Shamshy (seat: Shamshy; incl. Chong-Jar, Kosh-Kashat and Karagul)

Famous people born in Chüy District
 Ashyraaly Botaliev, born in 1906, opera and drama artist
 Djamankul Djenchuraev, born in 1907, Kyrgyz and Soviet writer, border guard
 Asankan Djumakmatov, born in 1923, orchestral conductor
 Sultan Ibraimov, born in 1927, politician
 Kalmyrza Sarpek uulu, born in 1866, akyn

See also
Krasnyy Most

References

External links
Tokmok (ru)

Districts of Chüy Region